Helicia lamingtoniana, also named Lamington's silky oak, is a species of rainforest trees, of northeastern Queensland, Australia, from the flowering plant family Proteaceae.

They are endemic to the southern upland rainforests of the Wet Tropics region, from about  altitude.

 this species has the official, current, Qld government conservation status of "near threatened" species.

References

lamingtoniana
Proteales of Australia
Flora of Queensland